The Wivenhoe Power Station is situated between the Splityard Creek Dam and Lake Wivenhoe.

The body of water held behind the dam is called Lake Wivenhoe.

Operation 
The pumped storage hydroelectricity power station consists of two circular concrete silos, each of about  internal diameter.

During the pumping phase in the operating cycle the generator operates as a 240MW electric motor driving the pump to lift water from Lake Wivenhoe to the upper storage of the 28,600-megalitre Splityard Creek Dam. When peak demand for electricity occurs the flow of water is reversed, flowing from the upper to the lower storage and driving the turbine generator to generate electricity. 

The Splityard Creek dam has sufficient capacity for 10 hours of continuous power generation. It takes about 14 hours of pumping to refill it. Wivenhoe is used in 20% of peak hours, reducing peak price obtained by other power plants. It earned almost $35 million when the Callide Power Station failed in 2021.
The power station is owned and operated by CleanCo Queensland Limited a Queensland Government owned corporation.  Twin 275KV transmission lines connect the power station to Queensland's grid system.

A second hydro-electric power station known as Wivenhoe Small Hydro powered by water discharging from the Wivenhoe Dam into the Brisbane River commenced operation in March 2003. It has a much lower power output of 4.5 MW.

See also

List of active power stations in Queensland

References

External links
CleanCo Qld page on Wivenhoe Power Station

Energy infrastructure completed in 1984
Hydroelectric power stations in Queensland
Pumped-storage hydroelectric power stations in Australia
Brisbane River
Buildings and structures in Somerset Region
1984 establishments in Australia